Ecological Modelling is a monthly peer-reviewed scientific journal covering the use of ecosystem models in the field of ecology. It was founded in 1975 by Sven Erik Jørgensen and is published by Elsevier. The current editor-in-chief is Brian D. Fath (Towson University). According to the Journal Citation Reports, the journal has a 2016 impact factor of 2.363.

References

External links

Ecology journals
Elsevier academic journals
Monthly journals
Publications established in 1975
English-language journals